A number of different companies have used the name Regal Manufacturing Company.

 The Regal Manufacturing Company, formerly Emil Wulschner & Son, was a manufacturer of fretted musical instruments in Indianapolis from 1901 to 1904
 The current Regal Manufacturing Company was established to manufacture brushes in 1934. Their current headquarters are in Fond du Lac, Wisconsin

Companies by that name also manufacture:

 Bar stools
 Covered elastic textiles

See also

Regal Musical Instrument Company
Regal Seating Company

External links
AMERICAN FRETTED MUSICAL INSTRUMENT MAKERS, pre-Civil War to WWII, comprehensive list
Regal Manufacturing Company, Inc. - brush maker
Regal Manufacturing Company - Regal Seating Company - Barstools and Chairs Manufacturer
Regal Manufacturing Company - textile manufacturer

Musical instrument manufacturing companies of the United States
Manufacturing companies based in Wisconsin